Wilcox is a census-designated place located in Jones Township, Elk County, Pennsylvania, United States. The community was named after a settler, Col. A.I. Wilcox. As of the 2010 census, Wilcox had a population of 383.

Wilcox is located in the west-central part of Jones Township in northern Elk County, in the valley of the West Branch of the Clarion River, a tributary of the Allegheny River. U.S. Route 219 passes through the center of town, leading north  to Bradford and south  to Ridgway, the Elk County seat. Pennsylvania Route 321 leads northwest from Wilcox  to Kane. The Swedish Lutheran Parsonage located at 230 Kane Street was added to the National Register of Historic Places in 2005.

The year 2008 marked the 150th anniversary of the settlement of this village. Wilcox is located on the Allegheny Plateau near the East Branch Clarion River Lake. Over 250,000 visitors a year come to Wilcox to enjoy the natural foresting, fishing, hunting, and three state and national parks.

See also

 List of census-designated places in Pennsylvania

References

External links

 Jones Township history

Census-designated places in Pennsylvania
Census-designated places in Elk County, Pennsylvania